LaMar C. Berrett (March 28, 1926 – August 25, 2007) was an American professor of religion at Brigham Young University (BYU). He was a member of the Church of Jesus Christ of Latter-day Saints.

Biography
Berrett was born in Riverton, Utah. He joined the United States Army in 1944 and fought in the Battle of the Bulge during World War II.  After the war, he served as an LDS missionary in the Southern States Mission. He earned his bachelor's degree from the University of Utah and a master's degree from BYU. He also held an Ed.D. from BYU.

Berrett worked as an LDS seminary teacher in Copperton, Utah and Heber City, Utah, then he was a BYU religion professor for 29 years. He was a tour guide in Israel and travelled the world. He married Darlene Hamilton in the Salt Lake Temple in 1950 and they had nine children.

Publications
Berrett wrote Discovering the World of the Bible (BYU Press, 1973).  He edited six volumes in the Sacred Places series about specific locations connected with the history of the LDS Church. He also wrote Holy Places: A History of Latter-day Saints in the Near East.

References
Maxwell Institute bio
Deseret News, August 28, 2007 obituary

External links 
 
 Library Thing entry on Berrett

1926 births
2007 deaths
American Latter Day Saint writers
American Mormon missionaries in the United States
Brigham Young University alumni
Brigham Young University faculty
Church Educational System instructors
Historians of the Latter Day Saint movement
People from Heber City, Utah
People from Riverton, Utah
University of Utah alumni
Latter Day Saints from Utah
United States Army personnel of World War II
United States Army soldiers